{{DISPLAYTITLE:C6H12O4}}
The molecular formula C6H12O4 (molar mass: 148.15 g/mol, exact mass: 148.073559) may refer to:

 Acetone peroxide
 Colitose
 Cyclohexanetetrols
 1,2,3,4-Cyclohexanetetrol
 1,2,3,5-Cyclohexanetetrol
 1,2,4,5-Cyclohexanetetrol
 2,3-Dihydroxy-3-methylpentanoic acid
 Kethoxal
 Mevalonic acid
 Pantoic acid